STP may refer to:

Places
 São Tomé and Príncipe (ISO 3166-1 alpha-3 code, IOC country code, and FIFA country code STP)
 London St Pancras (Domestic) railway station (National Rail code STP)
 St. Paul Downtown Airport (IATA airport code STP) in Saint Paul, Minnesota, US

Businesses and organizations
 German Union of Saddlers, Upholsterers and Portfolio Makers, a former German trade union
 STP (motor oil company)
 Segmenting-targeting-positioning, a framework in marketing
 Society for Threatened Peoples, an international NGO
 Space Test Program, a spaceflight provider for US DoD
 Suntech Power (NYSE symbol STP)

Drugs
 2,5-Dimethoxy-4-methylamphetamine, a psychedelic drug also known as DOM or STP

Entertainment
 Star Trek: Picard (2020 TV series), an American science fiction TV series
 Star Trek: Prodigy (2021 TV series), an American science fiction children's TV series

Music
 Stone Temple Pilots, an American rock band
 "S.T.P.", a song on the album Robbin' the Hood by the band Sublime
 STP, an American band with Julia Cafritz

Computing
 ISO 10303-21, the STEP CAD exchange file extension
 Serial ATA Tunneling Protocol, supporting SATA devices in SAS bays
 Server Time Protocol, to synchronize clocks
 Shielded twisted pair, a type of cable
 Signal Transfer Point, an SS7 packet switch
 Spanning Tree Protocol, a network protocol
 Software Technology Parks of India
 Straight-through processing, without repeating data entry for a financial transaction

Medicine
 Scientist Training Programme, a UK healthcare training scheme under Modernising Scientific Careers
 Sustainability and transformation plan, a scheme in NHS England

Other uses in science and technology
 Standard temperature and pressure, 0 °C and 100 kPa
 Sewage Treatment Plant, a site where wastewater is cleaned
 Shovel test pit, a method of archaeological survey
 Sodium triphosphate, used in detergents, etc.
 Stand-to-pee device, a female urination device

Other uses
 Sacrae Theologiae Professor, a Catholic degree
 Seattle to Portland Bicycle Classic
 Soviet-type economic planning
 25 metre standard pistol, a shooting sport
 Sticky toffee pudding, Lake District, UK

See also